The National Union of Journalists of the Philippines (NUJP) is a Filipino non-governmental trade association that represents the interests of Filipino journalists. Among its leadership are representatives from ABS-CBN, DZMM, GMA, the Philippine Daily Inquirer, The Philippine Star, CNN Philippines, Central Luzon Television, SunStar, and TV5 (Interaksyon). It has campaigned in support of journalists it sees as being under attack, such as Maria Ressa of Rappler and organizations such as ABS-CBN. It is often quoted in the Philippine and international media in relationship to press freedom issues in the country.

The organization was founded in 1986 by Tony Nieva. Between then and 2013, they documented the murders of 167 Filipino journalists.

NUJP was chaired by Jose Jaime Espina from 2018 until 2021. Its current chair is Jonathan de Santos, and its secretary general is Ronalyn Olea. Its directors are elected at a biennial congress.

References 

Trade unions established in 1986
Journalism in the Philippines
Human rights in the Philippines
Trade associations based in the Philippines
Human rights organizations based in the Philippines